Birthdays was a British High Street greeting cards retailer. From its beginning in 1966, Ron Wood Greeting Cards operated as a wholesaler of greeting cards and gift wrap in Bury, Greater Manchester. In the mid-1970s three card shops were opened and soon the number had increased to thirty. In 1986 the Birthdays concept was launched, and the product range gradually diversified to include novelties, soft toys and ornaments. Birthdays operated for over 40 years under various names.

The chain's head office was incorporated with that of Clinton Cards in Loughton, Essex.

Acquisition
In 2002, Clinton Cards approached Birthdays with a buyout offer reportedly worth roughly £100 million. The two sides, however, were unable to reach an agreement. In September 2003, investors instead sold the company to Scottish entrepreneur Tom Hunter in partnership with Chris Gorman, owner of the Gadget Shop chain of retail novelty stores, for an estimated £60 million, and began making plans to cross-market Birthdays' and Gadget Shops' product ranges in each other's stores.

Hunter and Gorman soon discovered that Birthdays required a larger injection of capital investment than either was willing or able to provide. In November 2004, it was announced Birthdays had again been sold, this time to Clinton Cards who had originally approached the company 2 years prior, for a total of just £50 million, to become a wholly owned subsidiary of Clinton Cards plc.

2009 administration
It was announced on 21 May 2009 that the company had gone into administration, though parent company Clinton Cards said all of the stores would remain open for the time being.

Just under two months later, Clinton Cards bought back 180 of the Birthdays stores, closing some. In Scotland, only 15 stores remained open.

2012
In 2012 Clinton Cards as a group, including Birthdays, was placed into administration. This followed unsuccessful attempts to sell the Birthdays chain. The Clinton/Birthdays store network was placed in the hands of administrator Zolfo Cooper, who undertook attempts to sell the store network; however, there were indications that many stores, including the entire Birthdays estate, would be closed as part of the process.

In the event, many of the Birthdays stores were among the stores shut down by Zolfo Cooper, though a small number of the stores currently branded as Birthdays were among the block of almost 400 stores purchased by American Greetings; with American Greetings having indicated that the store estate will be refreshed and refurbished following the acquisition, these remaining Birthdays stores may in time be rebranded under the new Clintons identity.

Retail companies established in 1966
Companies based in Bury, Greater Manchester
Companies that have entered administration in the United Kingdom